Matteo Regillo (born 24 April 2002) is a Swiss professional footballer who plays as a forward for Servette U21.

Professional career
On 2 June 2020, Regillo signed a professional contract with Servette FC until 2023. Regillo made his professional debut with Servette in a 2-1 Swiss Super League loss to FC Sion on 3 August 2020.

On 20 July 2021, he joined Étoile Carouge on a season-long loan.

References

External links
 
 
 SFL Profile
 SFV U17 Profile

2002 births
Footballers from Geneva
Swiss people of Italian descent
Living people
Swiss men's footballers
Switzerland youth international footballers
Association football forwards
Servette FC players
Étoile Carouge FC players
2. Liga Interregional players
Swiss Super League players
Swiss Promotion League players